Fabián Ríos may refer to:

 Fabián Ríos (politician) (born 1964), Argentine politician
 Fabián Ríos (actor) (born 1980), Colombian actor and model